Patrik Virta (born 6 March 1996) is a Finnish professional ice hockey forward who is currently playing under contract with Tappara in the Finnish Liiga.  Virta was selected by the New York Rangers in the 2017 NHL Entry Draft.

Playing career
Virta made his professional debut in his native Finland, appearing in the Liiga playing with his original youth club, HPK during the 2014–15 season.

Following a break out 2016–17 season with TPS, scoring 14 goals and 26 points in 49 contests, Virta was selected as an overage prospect by the New York Rangers in the seventh round, 208th overall, in the 2017 NHL Entry Draft on 26 June 2017. He continued his development in the 2017–18 season, matching his 14 goals scores while improving his offensive output to 40 points in 58 games.

Without a contract offer from the Rangers, Virta opted leave the Liiga and continue his development in the KHL, securing a one-year contract with Slovak club, HC Slovan Bratislava, on 17 July 2018. Virta later reached a mutual contract termination with Slovan and signed with Örebro HK in the Swedish Hockey League. In joining Örebro during the 2018-19 season, Virta immediately adjusted within the team, scoring 7 goals and 15 points in 37 games.

On 19 June 2019, Virta returned to the Liiga as a free agent, agreeing to a two-year contract with Tappara.

Career statistics

References

External links

1996 births
Living people
Finnish ice hockey forwards
HPK players
New York Rangers draft picks
Örebro HK players
SaPKo players
HC Slovan Bratislava players
HC TPS players
TuTo players
Tappara players
People from Hämeenlinna
Sportspeople from Kanta-Häme
Finnish expatriate ice hockey players in Slovakia
Finnish expatriate ice hockey players in Sweden